Bosse Wirebrand (born 2 March 1946) is a former international speedway rider from Sweden.

Speedway career 
Wirebrand won the silver medal at the 1973 Swedish Championship. He rode in the top tier of British Speedway from 1971 to 1978, riding for various clubs.

References 

Living people
1946 births
Swedish speedway riders
Newport Wasps riders
Poole Pirates riders
Sheffield Tigers riders
People from Vetlanda Municipality
Sportspeople from Jönköping County